Mark Meechan (born 19 October 1987) is a Scottish YouTuber and former UK Independence Party candidate for the European Parliament. He uses the pseudonym Count Dankula.

Meechan received press coverage when he posted a video showing him teaching his girlfriend's dog how to raise its paw in the manner of a Nazi salute, and to react to the phrase "Do you wanna gas the Jews?" Meechan was arrested and convicted of being "grossly offensive" under the Communications Act 2003, following a trial in March 2018. The arrest generated controversy and discussions about free speech. In April 2018, Meechan was fined £800. Meechan stated he would not pay the fine, and instead donated £800 to the Glasgow Children's Hospital Charity. In March 2019, the money was seized from his bank account by an arrestment order.

Arrest 
In April 2016, Meechan posted a video on YouTube of his girlfriend's pet pug Buddha titled "M8 Yer Dugs A Nazi". At the start of the video, he says: "My girlfriend is always ranting and raving about how cute and adorable her wee dog is so I thought I would turn him into the least cute thing I could think of, which is a Nazi." In the video, the dog, prompted by the command "Sieg Heil", raises his right paw in the manner of a Nazi salute, watches a speech by Adolf Hitler (footage shown from the Triumph of the Will), and responds immediately when Meechan asks if he wants to "gas the Jews". It ends with images of Hitler and Buddha the dog depicted with a toothbrush moustache similar to Hitler's.

Meechan was arrested on suspicion of breaching the Communications Act 2003. On 19 March 2018, Meechan was convicted of breaching the act by Sheriff Derek O'Carroll at Airdrie Sheriff Court. The court ruled that Meechan's claim that the video was a joke intended for his girlfriend "lacked credibility" as Meechan's girlfriend did not subscribe to the YouTube channel to which the video was posted. On 23 April 2018, Meechan was sentenced to a fine of £800, with no prison sentence.

Reaction 
Approximately 500 people gathered in London to protest for free speech when the sentence was handed out. Following Meechan's conviction, British comedians Ricky Gervais and David Baddiel made comments supporting Meechan. Others who opposed the prosecution included Kenan Malik, Tim Blair, Helen Dale, Douglas Murray, Tom Walker, Shappi Khorsandi, Marc Randazza, Jonathan Turley and Stephen Fry. Index on Censorship CEO Jodie Ginsberg stated that the right to free expression must include the right to offend, "otherwise the freedom is meaningless".

Sitcom writer Graham Linehan condemned Meechan. Meechan responded by saying that Linehan's show Father Ted also contained Nazi-related jokes. Meechan was scrutinised for embracing support from right-wing figures Alex Jones and Tommy Robinson, to which he replied: "Imagine totally abandoning protecting human rights, just because someone you don't like is defending them too. Astounding." On 6 May 2018, Meechan spoke at the "Day for Freedom" rally, organised by Robinson, which was described as far-right by news media and observers.

David Coburn, the United Kingdom Independence Party Member of the European Parliament for Scotland, released a two-page statement condemning the ruling as "an embarrassment". Philip Davies, Conservative MP for Shipley, brought up Meechan's case in the House of Commons and said: "Can we have a debate about freedom of speech in this country – something this country has long held dear and is in danger of throwing away needlessly?"

Meechan started a GoFundMe campaign on 24 April 2018 to raise £100,000 for an appeal and reached his goal as of 25 April. In August 2018, Meechan announced that his request for an appeal had been denied by a member of the Sheriff Appeal Court, who also accused Meechan's lawyer of contempt. The letter stated that the appeal was "not arguable" due to the nature of the "deeply unpleasant offence". Meechan stated that he planned to contest the matter with the Scottish Criminal Cases Review Commission. Meechan's lawyer Dorothy Bain subsequently petitioned the High Court of Justiciary to hear the case. Senior judge Lord Carloway opined that the High Court did not have the power to grant an appeal denied by the Sheriff Court. In March 2019, the £800 was seized from Meechan's bank account under an arrestment order.

On 17 June 2020, Meechan announced that his additional appeal to the Supreme Court was also rejected. Meechan stated his intention to bring the case to the European Court of Human Rights.

BBC Scotland planned to feature Meechan in a 2019 debate program, The Collective, and had him film two episodes. However, the network announced that these episodes would not be aired after a backlash over the announcement. BBC Three produced a documentary on Meechan's case which aired in July 2019.

Politics 
On 16 June 2018, Meechan announced that he had joined UKIP along with fellow YouTubers Carl Benjamin and Paul Joseph Watson in what Watson describes as an attempted "soft coup".

In April 2019, Meechan said he intended to stand for MEP on behalf of UKIP in the upcoming 2019 European Parliament election in the United Kingdom. He was named fourth on UKIP's list in Scotland, but was not elected after UKIP won only 1.8% of the vote in Scotland.

In November 2019, Meechan posted a video announcing that he had left UKIP, citing internal disputes and backstabbing within the party over their leadership as his reason for leaving.

Meechan ran in the 2021 Scottish Parliament election as a candidate for the Scottish Libertarian Party, finishing fifth in Motherwell and Wishaw with 254 votes. He was also first on the party's regional list for the Central Scotland region.

Personal life 
Meechan married in 2019. His wife gave birth to their daughter in 2021.

Electoral history
2021

See also 

 Censorship in the United Kingdom
 Jackie, a Dalmatian taught by its owner to do Nazi salutes and whose owner was investigated by authorities, but charges were dropped for lack of evidence
 Twitter Joke Trial
 Tommy Robinson

References

External links 

 
 

Living people
1987 births
British people convicted of hate crimes
Internet censorship in the United Kingdom
Scottish YouTubers
People from Coatbridge
YouTube controversies
UK Independence Party people
Scottish libertarians
Politicians from North Lanarkshire